The just war theory is a doctrine, also referred to as a tradition, of military ethics which is studied by military leaders, theologians, ethicists and policy makers. The purpose of the doctrine is to ensure that a war is morally justifiable through a series of criteria, all of which must be met for a war to be considered just. The first group of criteria concerns the morality of going to war, and the second group of criteria concerns the moral conduct within war. There have been calls for the inclusion of a third category of just war theory (jus post bellum) dealing with the morality of post-war settlement and reconstruction. The just war theory postulates the belief that war, while it is terrible but less so with the right conduct, is not always the worst option. Important responsibilities, undesirable outcomes, or preventable atrocities may justify war.

Opponents of the just war theory may either be inclined to a stricter pacifist standard (proposing that there has never been nor can there ever be a justifiable basis for war) or they may be inclined toward a more permissive nationalist standard (proposing that a war need only to serve a nation's interests to be justifiable). In many cases, philosophers state that individuals do not need to be plagued by a guilty conscience if they are required to fight. A few philosophers ennoble the virtues of the soldier while they also declare their apprehensions for war itself. A few, such as Rousseau, argue for insurrection against oppressive rule.

The historical aspect, or the "just war tradition", deals with the historical body of rules or agreements that have applied in various wars across the ages. The just war tradition also considers the writings of various philosophers and lawyers through history, and examines both their philosophical visions of war's ethical limits and whether their thoughts have contributed to the body of conventions that have evolved to guide war and warfare.

Origins

Ancient Egypt
A 2017 study found that the just war tradition can be traced as far back as to Ancient Egypt. Egyptian ethics of war usually centered on three main ideas, these including the cosmological role of Egypt, the pharaoh as a divine office and executor of the will of the gods, and the superiority of the Egyptian state and population over all other states and peoples. Egyptian political theology held that the pharaoh had the exclusive legitimacy in justly initiating a war, usually claimed to carry out the will of the gods. Senusret I, in the Twelfth Dynasty, claimed, "I was nursed to be a conqueror...his [Atum's] son and his protector, he gave me to conquer what he conquered." Later pharaohs also considered their sonship of the god Amun-Re as granting them absolute ability to declare war on the deity's behalf. Pharaohs often visited temples prior to initiating campaigns, where the pharaoh was believed to receive their commands of war from the deities. For example, Kamose claimed that "I went north because I was strong (enough) to attack the Asiatics through the command of Amon, the just of counsels." A stele erected by Thutmose III at the Temple of Amun at Karnak "provides an unequivocal statement of the pharaoh's divine mandate to wage war on his enemies." As the period of the New Kingdom progressed and Egypt heightened its territorial ambition, so did the invocation of just war aid the justification of these efforts. The universal principle of Maat, signifying order and justice, was central to the Egyptian notion of just war and its ability to guarantee Egypt virtually no limits on what it could take, do, or use to guarantee the ambitions of the state.

Confucian
Chinese philosophy produced a massive body of work on warfare, much of it during the Zhou dynasty, especially the Warring States era. War was justified only as a last resort and only by the rightful sovereign; however, questioning the decision of the emperor concerning the necessity of a military action was not permissible. The success of a military campaign was sufficient proof that the campaign had been righteous.

Japan did not develop its own doctrine of just war but between the 5th and the 7th centuries drew heavily from Chinese philosophy, and especially Confucian views. As part of the Japanese campaign to take the northeastern island Honshu, Japanese military action was portrayed as an effort to "pacify" the Emishi people, who were likened to "bandits" and "wild-hearted wolf cubs" and accused of invading Japan's frontier lands.

India
The Indian Hindu epic, the Mahabharata, offers the first written discussions of a "just war" (dharma-yuddha or "righteous war"). In it, one of five ruling brothers (Pandavas) asks if the suffering caused by war can ever be justified. A long discussion then ensues between the siblings, establishing criteria like proportionality (chariots cannot attack cavalry, only other chariots; no attacking people in distress), just means (no poisoned or barbed arrows), just cause (no attacking out of rage), and fair treatment of captives and the wounded.
The war in the Mahabharata is preceded by context that develops the "just cause" for the war including last-minute efforts to reconcile differences to avoid war. At the beginning of the war, there is the discussion of "just conduct" appropriate to the context of war.

In Sikhism, the term dharamyudh describes a war that is fought for just, righteous or religious reasons, especially in defence of one's own beliefs. Though some core tenets in the Sikh religion are understood to emphasise peace and nonviolence, especially before the 1606 execution of Guru Arjan by Mughal emperor Jahangir, military force may be justified if all peaceful means to settle a conflict have been exhausted, thus resulting in a dharamyudh.

Ancient Greece and Rome
The notion of just war in Europe originates and is developed first in ancient Greece and then in the Roman Empire.

It was Aristotle who first introduced the concept and terminology to the Hellenic world that called war a last resort requiring conduct that would allow the restoration of peace. Aristotle argues that the cultivation of a military is necessary and good for the purpose of self-defense, not for conquering: "The proper object of practising military training is not in order that men may enslave those who do not deserve slavery, but in order that first they may themselves avoid becoming enslaved to others" (Politics, Book 7).

In ancient Rome, a "just cause" for war might include the necessity of repelling an invasion, or retaliation for pillaging or a breach of treaty. War was always potentially nefas ("wrong, forbidden"), and risked religious pollution and divine disfavor. A "just war" (bellum iustum) thus required a ritualized declaration by the fetial priests. More broadly, conventions of war and treaty-making were part of the ius gentium, the "law of nations", the customary moral obligations regarded as innate and universal to human beings. The quintessential explanation of Just War theory in the ancient world is found in Cicero's De Officiis, Book 1, sections 1.11.33–1.13.41. Although, it is well known that Julius Caesar did not often follow these necessities.

Muslim teaching of Jihad

"Jihad" is an Arabic word which literally means "striving" or "struggling", especially with a praiseworthy aim. In an Islamic context, it can refer to almost any effort to make personal and social life conform with God's guidance, such as struggle against one's evil inclinations, proselytizing, or efforts toward the moral betterment of the Muslim community (Ummah), though it is most frequently associated with war. In classical Islamic law (sharia), the term refers to armed struggle against unbelievers, while modernist Islamic scholars generally equate military jihad with defensive warfare. In Sufi circles, spiritual and moral jihad has been traditionally emphasized under the name of greater jihad. The term has gained additional attention in recent decades through its use by various insurgent Islamic extremist, militant Islamist, and terrorist individuals and organizations whose ideology is based on the Islamic notion of jihad.

The word jihad appears frequently in the Qur'an with and without military connotations, often in the idiomatic expression "striving in the path of God (al-jihad fi sabil Allah)", conveying a sense of self-exertion. They developed an elaborate set of rules pertaining to jihad, including prohibitions on harming those who are not engaged in combat.
In the modern era, the notion of jihad has lost its jurisprudential relevance and instead given rise to an ideological and political discourse. While modernist Islamic scholars have emphasized the defensive and non-military aspects of jihad, some Islamists have advanced aggressive interpretations that go beyond the classical theory.

Jihad is classified into inner ("greater") jihad, which involves a struggle against one's own base impulses, and external ("lesser") jihad, which is further subdivided into jihad of the pen/tongue (debate or persuasion) and jihad of the sword. Most Western writers consider external jihad to have primacy over inner jihad in the Islamic tradition, while much of contemporary Muslim opinion favors the opposite view.

The sense of jihad as armed resistance was first used in the context of persecution faced by Muslims, as when Muhammad was at Mecca, when the community had two choices: emigration (hijra) or jihad. In Twelver Shi'a Islam, jihad is one of the ten Practices of the Religion. A person engaged in jihad is called a mujahid (plural: mujahideen). The term jihad is often rendered in English as "Holy War", although this translation is controversial. Today, the word jihad is often used without religious connotations, like the English crusade.

Christian views
Christian theory of the Just War begins around the time of Augustine of Hippo The Just War theory, with some amendments, is still used by 
Christians today as a guide to whether or not a war can be justified.
War may be necessary and right, even though it may not be good. In the case of a country that has been invaded by an occupying force, war may be the only way to restore justice.

Saint Augustine
Saint Augustine held that individuals should not resort immediately to violence, but God has given the sword to government for a good reason (based upon Romans 13:4). In Contra Faustum Manichaeum book 22 sections 69–76, Augustine argues that Christians, as part of a government, need not be ashamed of protecting peace and punishing wickedness when they are forced to do so by a government. Augustine asserted that was a personal and philosophical stance: "What is here required is not a bodily action, but an inward disposition. The sacred seat of virtue is the heart."

Nonetheless, he asserted, peacefulness in the face of a grave wrong that could be stopped by only violence would be a sin. Defense of one's self or others could be a necessity, especially when it is authorized by a legitimate authority:They who have waged war in obedience to the divine command, or in conformity with His laws, have represented in their persons the public justice or the wisdom of government, and in this capacity have put to death wicked men; such persons have by no means violated the commandment, "Thou shalt not kill."While not breaking down the conditions necessary for war to be just, Augustine nonetheless originated the very phrase itself in his work The City of God:But, say they, the wise man will wage Just Wars. As if he would not all the rather lament the necessity of just wars, if he remembers that he is a man; for if they were not just he would not wage them, and would therefore be delivered from all wars.J. Mark Mattox writes,In terms of the traditional notion of jus ad bellum (justice of war, that is, the circumstances in which wars can be justly fought), war is a coping mechanism for righteous sovereigns who would ensure that their violent international encounters are minimal, a reflection of the Divine Will to the greatest extent possible, and always justified.  In terms of the traditional notion of jus in bello (justice in war, or the moral considerations which ought to constrain the use of violence in war), war is a coping mechanism for righteous combatants who, by divine edict, have no choice but to subject themselves to their political masters and seek to ensure that they execute their war-fighting duty as justly as possible.

Saint Thomas Aquinas
The just war theory by Thomas Aquinas has had a lasting impact on later generations of thinkers and was part of an emerging consensus in Medieval Europe on just war. In the 13th century Aquinas reflected in detail on peace and war. Aquinas was a Dominican friar and contemplated the teachings of the Bible on peace and war in combination with ideas from Aristotle, Plato, Saint Augustine and other philosophers whose writings are part of the Western canon. Aquinas' views on war drew heavily on the Decretum Gratiani, a book the Italian monk Gratian had compiled with passages from the Bible. After its publication in the 12th century, the Decretum Gratiani had been republished with commentary from Pope Innocent IV and the Dominican friar Raymond of Penafort. Other significant influences on Aquinas just war theory were Alexander of Hales and Henry of Segusio.

In Summa Theologica Aquinas asserted that it is not always a sin to wage war, and he set out criteria for a just war. According to Aquinas, three requirements must be met. Firstly, the war must be waged upon the command of a rightful sovereign. Secondly, the war needs to be waged for just cause, on account of some wrong the attacked have committed. Thirdly, warriors must have the right intent, namely to promote good and to avoid evil. Aquinas came to the conclusion that a just war could be offensive and that injustice should not be tolerated so as to avoid war. Nevertheless, Aquinas argued that violence must only be used as a last resort. On the battlefield, violence was only justified to the extent it was necessary. Soldiers needed to avoid cruelty and a just war was limited by the conduct of just combatants. Aquinas argued that it was only in the pursuit of justice, that the good intention of a moral act could justify negative consequences, including the killing of the innocent during a war.

First World War 
At the beginning of the First World War, a group of theologians in Germany published a manifesto that sought to justify the actions of the German government. At the British government's request, Randall Davidson, Archbishop of Canterbury, took the lead in collaborating with a large number of other religious leaders, including some with whom he had differed in the past, to write a rebuttal of the Germans' contentions. Both German and British theologians based themselves on the just war theory, each group seeking to prove that it applied to the war waged by its own side.

Contemporary Catholic doctrine
The just war doctrine of the Catholic Church found in the 1992 Catechism of the Catholic Church, in paragraph 2309, lists four strict conditions for "legitimate defense by military force:"
 The damage inflicted by the aggressor on the nation or community of nations must be lasting, grave and certain.
 All other means of putting an end to it must have been shown to be impractical or ineffective.
 there must be serious prospects of success.
 The use of arms must not produce evils and disorders graver than the evil to be eliminated.
 
The Compendium of the Social Doctrine of the Church elaborates on the just war doctrine in paragraphs 500 to 501:
 
If this responsibility justifies the possession of sufficient means to exercise this right to defense, States still have the obligation to do everything possible "to ensure that the conditions of peace exist, not only within their own territory but throughout the world". It is important to remember that "it is one thing to wage a war of self-defense; it is quite another to seek to impose domination on another nation. The possession of war potential does not justify the use of force for political or military objectives. Nor does the mere fact that war has unfortunately broken out mean that all is fair between the warring parties".
The Charter of the United Nations intends to preserve future generations from war with a prohibition against force to resolve disputes between States. Like most philosophy, it permits legitimate defense and measures to maintain peace. In every case, the charter requires that self-defense must respect the traditional limits of necessity and proportionality.
 
Therefore, engaging in a preventive war without clear proof that an attack is imminent cannot fail to raise serious moral and juridical questions. International legitimacy for the use of armed force, on the basis of rigorous assessment and with well-founded motivations, can only be given by the decision of a competent body that identifies specific situations as threats to peace and authorizes an intrusion into the sphere of autonomy usually reserved to a State.
 
Pope John Paul II in an address to a group of soldiers said the following:

Russian Orthodox Church
The War and Peace section in the Basis of the Social Concept of the Russian Orthodox Church is crucial for understanding the Russian Orthodox Church's attitude towards war. The document offers criteria of distinguishing between an aggressive war, which is unacceptable, and a justified war, attributing the highest moral and sacred value of military acts of bravery to a true believer who participates in a justified war. Additionally, the document considers the just war criteria as developed in Western Christianity to be eligible for Russian Orthodoxy; therefore, the justified war theory in Western theology is also applicable to the Russian Orthodox Church.

In the same document, it is stated that wars have accompanied human history since the fall of man, and according to the gospel, they will continue to accompany it. While recognizing war as evil, the Russian Orthodox Church does not prohibit its members from participating in hostilities if there is the security of their neighbours and the restoration of trampled justice at stake. War is considered to be necessary but undesirable. It is also stated that the Russian Orthodox Church has had profound respect for soldiers who gave their lives to protect the life and security of their neighbours.

Just war tradition
The just war theory, propounded by the medieval Christian philosopher Thomas Aquinas, was developed further by legal scholars in the context of international law. Cardinal Cajetan, the jurist Francisco de Vitoria, the two Jesuit priests Luis de Molina and Francisco Suárez, as well as the humanist Hugo Grotius and the lawyer Luigi Taparelli were most influential in the formation of a just war tradition. The just war tradition, which was well established by the 19th century, found its practical application in the Hague Peace Conferences (1899 and 1907) and in the founding of the League of Nations in 1920. After the United States Congress declared war on Germany in 1917, Cardinal James Gibbons issued a letter that all Catholics were to support the war because "Our Lord Jesus Christ does not stand for peace at any price... If by Pacifism is meant the teaching that the use of force is never justifiable, then, however well meant, it is mistaken, and it is hurtful to the life of our country."

Armed conflicts such as the Spanish Civil War, World War II and the Cold War were, as a matter of course, judged according to the norms (as established in Aquinas' just war theory) by philosophers such as Jacques Maritain, Elizabeth Anscombe and John Finnis.

The first work dedicated specifically to just war was the 15th-century sermon De bellis justis of Stanisław of Skarbimierz (1360–1431), who justified war by the Kingdom of Poland against the Teutonic Knights. Francisco de Vitoria criticized the conquest of America by the Spanish conquistadors on the basis of just-war theory. With Alberico Gentili and Hugo Grotius, just war theory was replaced by international law theory, codified as a set of rules, which today still encompass the points commonly debated, with some modifications.

Just-war theorists combine a moral abhorrence towards war with a readiness to accept that war may sometimes be necessary. The criteria of the just-war tradition act as an aid in determining whether resorting to arms is morally permissible. Just-war theories aim "to distinguish between justifiable and unjustifiable uses of organized armed forces"; they attempt "to conceive of how the use of arms might be restrained, made more humane, and ultimately directed towards the aim of establishing lasting peace and justice". Although the criticism can be made that the application of just war theory is relativistic, one of the fundamental bases of the tradition is the Ethic of Reciprocity, particularly when it comes to in bello considerations of deportment during battle. If one set of combatants promise to treat their enemies with a modicum of restraint and respect, then the hope is that other sets of combatants will do similarly in reciprocation (a concept not unrelated to the considerations of game theory).

The just war tradition addresses the morality of the use of force in two parts: when it is right to resort to armed force (the concern of jus ad bellum) and what is acceptable in using such force (the concern of jus in bello). In more recent years, a third category—jus post bellum—has been added by certain theorists and addresses the justice of war termination and peace agreements, as well as the prosecution of war criminals.

In 1869 the Russian military theorist  theorised on the advantages and potential benefits of war.

The Soviet leader Vladimir Lenin defined only three types of just war, all of which share the central trait of being revolutionary in character. In simple terms: "To the Russian workers has fallen the honor and the good fortune of being the first to start the revolution—the great and only legitimate and just war, the war of the oppressed against the oppressors", with these two opposing categories being defined in terms of class, as is typical in the left. In that manner, Lenin shunned the more common interpretation of a defensive war as a just one, often summarized as "who fired the first shot?", precisely because it failed to take into consideration the class factor. Which side initiated aggressions or had a grievance or any other commonly-considered factor of jus ad bellum mattered not at all, he claimed. if one side was being oppressed by the other, the war against the oppressor would always be, by definition, a defensive war anyway. Any war lacking that duality of oppressed and oppressor was, in contradistinction, always a reactionary, unjust war, in which the oppressed effectively fight in order to protect their own oppressors:
But picture to yourselves a slave-owner who owned 100 slaves warring against a slave-owner who owned 200 slaves for a more "just" distribution of slaves. Clearly, the application of the term "defensive" war, or war "for the defense of the fatherland" in such a case would be historically false, and in practice would be sheer deception of the common people, of philistines, of ignorant people, by the astute slaveowners. Precisely in this way are the present-day imperialist bourgeoisie deceiving the peoples by means of "national ideology" and the term "defense of the fatherland" in the present war between slave-owners for fortifying and strengthening slavery.

The anarcho-capitalist scholar Murray Rothbard (1926-1995) stated that "a just war exists when a people tries to ward off the threat of coercive domination by another people, or to overthrow an already-existing domination. A war is unjust, on the other hand, when a people try to impose domination on another people or try to retain an already-existing coercive rule over them."

Jonathan Riley-Smith writes:
The consensus among Christians on the use of violence has changed radically since the crusades were fought. The just war theory prevailing for most of the last two centuries—that violence is an evil that can, in certain situations, be condoned as the lesser of evils—is relatively young. Although it has inherited some elements (the criteria of legitimate authority, just cause, right intention) from the older war theory that first evolved around AD 400, it has rejected two premises that underpinned all medieval just wars, including crusades: first, that violence could be employed on behalf of Christ's intentions for mankind and could even be directly authorized by him; and second, that it was a morally neutral force that drew whatever ethical coloring it had from the intentions of the perpetrators.

Criteria

The just war theory has two sets of criteria, the first establishing jus ad bellum (the right to go to war),and the second establishing jus in bello (right conduct within war).

Jus ad bellum

Just cause The reason for going to war needs to be just and cannot, therefore, be solely for recapturing things taken or punishing people who have done wrong; innocent life must be in imminent danger and intervention must be to protect life. A contemporary view of just cause was expressed in 1993 when the US Catholic Conference said: "Force may be used only to correct a grave, public evil, i.e., aggression or massive violation of the basic human rights of whole populations."
Comparative justice While there may be rights and wrongs on all sides of a conflict, to overcome the presumption against the use of force, the injustice suffered by one party must significantly outweigh that suffered by the other. Some theorists such as Brian Orend omit this term, seeing it as fertile ground for exploitation by bellicose regimes.
Competent authority Only duly constituted public authorities may wage war. "A just war must be initiated by a political authority within a political system that allows distinctions of justice. Dictatorships (e.g. Hitler's Regime) or deceptive military actions (e.g. the 1968 US bombing of Cambodia) are typically considered as violations of this criterion. The importance of this condition is key. Plainly, we cannot have a genuine process of judging a just war within a system that represses the process of genuine justice. A just war must be initiated by a political authority within a political system that allows distinctions of justice".
Right intention Force may be used only in a truly just cause and solely for that purpose—correcting a suffered wrong is considered a right intention, while material gain or maintaining economies is not.
Probability of success Arms may not be used in a futile cause or in a case where disproportionate measures are required to achieve success;
Last resort Force may be used only after all peaceful and viable alternatives have been seriously tried and exhausted or are clearly not practical. It may be clear that the other side is using negotiations as a delaying tactic and will not make meaningful concessions.
Proportionality The anticipated benefits of waging a war must be proportionate to its expected evils or harms. This principle is also known as the principle of macro-proportionality, so as to distinguish it from the jus in bello principle of proportionality.

In modern terms, just war is waged in terms of self-defense, or in defense of another (with sufficient evidence).

Jus in bello
Once war has begun, just war theory (jus in bello) also directs how combatants are to act or should act:

Distinction Just war conduct should be governed by the principle of distinction. The acts of war should be directed towards enemy combatants, and not towards non-combatants caught in circumstances they did not create. The prohibited acts include bombing civilian residential areas that include no legitimate military targets, committing acts of terrorism or reprisal against civilians or prisoners of war (POWs), and attacking neutral targets. Moreover, combatants are not permitted to attack enemy combatants who have surrendered or who have been captured or who are injured and not presenting an immediate lethal threat or who are parachuting from disabled aircraft and are not airborne forces or who are shipwrecked.

Proportionality Just war conduct should be governed by the principle of proportionality. Combatants must make sure that the harm caused to civilians or civilian property is not excessive in relation to the concrete and direct military advantage anticipated by an attack on a legitimate military objective. This principle is meant to discern the correct balance between the restriction imposed by a corrective measure and the severity of the nature of the prohibited act.

Military necessity Just war conduct should be governed by the principle of military necessity. An attack or action must be intended to help in the defeat of the enemy; it must be an attack on a legitimate military objective, and the harm caused to civilians or civilian property must be proportional and not excessive in relation to the concrete and direct military advantage anticipated. This principle is meant to limit excessive and unnecessary death and destruction.

Fair treatment of prisoners of war Enemy combatants who surrendered or who are captured no longer pose a threat. It is therefore wrong to torture them or otherwise mistreat them.

No means malum in se Combatants may not use weapons or other methods of warfare that are considered evil, such as mass rape, forcing enemy combatants to fight against their own side or using weapons whose effects cannot be controlled (e.g., nuclear/biological weapons).

Ending a war: Jus post bellum
In recent years, some theorists, such as Gary Bass, Louis Iasiello and Brian Orend, have proposed a third category within the just war theory. Jus post bellum concerns justice after a war, including peace treaties, reconstruction, environmental remediation, war crimes trials, and war reparations. Jus post bellum has been added to deal with the fact that some hostile actions may take place outside a traditional battlefield. Jus post bellum governs the justice of war termination and peace agreements, as well as the prosecution of war criminals, and publicly labelled terrorists. The idea has largely been added to help decide what to do if there are prisoners that have been taken during battle. It is, through government labelling and public opinion, that people use jus post bellum to justify the pursuit of labelled terrorist for the safety of the government's state in a modern context. The actual fault lies with the aggressor and so by being the aggressor, they forfeit their rights for honourable treatment by their actions. That theory is used to justify the actions taken by anyone fighting in a war to treat prisoners outside of war. Actions after a conflict can be warranted by actions observed during war, meaning that there can be justification to meet violence with violence even after war. Orend, who was one of the theorists mentioned earlier, proposes the following principles:

Just cause for terminationA state may terminate a war if there has been a reasonable vindication of the rights that were violated in the first place, and if the aggressor is willing to negotiate the terms of surrender. These terms of surrender include a formal apology, compensations, war crimes trials and perhaps rehabilitation. Alternatively, a state may end a war if it becomes clear that any just goals of the war cannot be reached at all or cannot be reached without using excessive force.
Right intentionA state must only terminate a war under the conditions agreed upon in the above criteria. Revenge is not permitted. The victor state must also be willing to apply the same level of objectivity and investigation into any war crimes its armed forces may have committed.
Public declaration and authorityThe terms of peace must be made by a legitimate authority, and the terms must be accepted by a legitimate authority.
DiscriminationThe victor state is to differentiate between political and military leaders, and combatants and civilians. Punitive measures are to be limited to those directly responsible for the conflict. Truth and reconciliation may sometimes be more important than punishing war crimes.
ProportionalityAny terms of surrender must be proportional to the rights that were initially violated. Draconian measures, absolutionist crusades, and any attempt at denying the surrendered country the right to participate in the world community are not permitted.

References

Further reading
 Benson, Richard. "The Just War Theory: A Traditional Catholic Moral View", The Tidings (2006). Showing the Catholic view in three points, including John Paul II's position concerning war.
 Blattberg, Charles. Taking War Seriously. A critique of just war theory.
 Brough, Michael W., John W. Lango, Harry van der Linden, eds., Rethinking the Just War Tradition (Albany, NY: SUNY Press, 2007). Discusses the contemporary relevance of just war theory. Offers an annotated bibliography of current writings on just war theory.
 Brunsletter, D., & D. O'Driscoll, Just war thinkers from Cicero to the 21st century (Routledge, 2017).
 
 Churchman, David. "Just War Theory Across Time and Culture" in Oliver Richmond, and Gëzim Visoka, eds. The Palgrave Encyclopedia of Peace and Conflict Studies (2022) https://doi.org/10.1007/978-3-030-77954-2_59
 Churchman, David. Why we fight: the origins, nature, and management of human conflict (University Press of America, 2013) online.
 Crawford, Neta. "Just War Theory and the US Countertenor War", Perspectives on Politics 1(1), 2003. online
 Elshtain, Jean Bethke, ed. Just war theory (NYU Press, 1992) online.
 Evans, Mark (editor) Just War Theory: A Reappraisal (Edinburgh University Press, 2005)
 Fotion, Nicholas. War and Ethics (London, New York: Continuum, 2007). . A defence of an updated form of just war theory.
 Heindel, Max. The Rosicrucian Philosophy in Questions and Answers – Volume II (The Philosophy of War, World War I reference, ed. 1918),  (Describing a philosophy of war and just war concepts from the point of view of his Rosicrucian Fellowship)
 Gutbrod, Hans. Assembling the Moral Puzzle – Just War Tradition and Karabakh ("Global Policy Journal", February 2021); illustrates how the just war theory can offer a comprehensive assessment of the 2020 conflict around Nagorno-Karabakh. 
 Gutbrod, Hans. Russia's Recent Invasion of Ukraine and Just War Theory ("Global Policy Journal", March 2022); applies the concept to Russia's February 2022 invasion of Ukraine.  
 Kelsay, John; Lo, PC; and Morkevicius, Valerie, "Comparative Ethics of War: Islamic, Chinese and Hindu Perspectives," McCain Conference, Stockdale Center, United States Naval Academy, 2011.
 Khawaja, Irfan. Review of Larry May, War Crimes and Just War, in Democratiya 10,, an extended critique of just war theory.
 
 MacDonald, David Roberts. Padre E. C. Crosse and 'the Devonshire Epitaph': The Astonishing Story of One Man at the Battle of the Somme (with Antecedents to Today's 'Just War' Dialogue), 2007 Cloverdale Books, South Bend. 
 McMahan, Jeff. "Just Cause for War," Ethics and International Affairs, 2005.
 Nájera, Luna. "Myth and Prophecy in Juan Ginés de Sepúlveda's Crusading "Exhortación" , in Bulletin for Spanish and Portuguese Historical Studies, 35:1 (2011). Discusses Sepúlveda's theories of war in relation to the war against the Ottoman Turks.
 Nardin, Terry, ed. The ethics of war and peace: Religious and secular perspectives (Princeton University Press, 1998) online
 O'Donovan, Oliver. The Just War Revisited (Cambridge: Cambridge University Press, 2003).
 Ramsey, Paul. The Just War (New York: Scribners, 1969).
 Steinhoff, Uwe. On the Ethics of War and Terrorism (Oxford, Oxford University Press, 2007). Covers the basics and some of the most controversial current debates.
 v. Starck, Christian (Ed.). Kann es heute noch gerechte Kriege geben? (Göttingen: Wallstein-Verlag, 2008). 
 Walzer, Michael. Just and Unjust Wars: A Moral Argument with Historical Illustrations, 4th ed. (New York: Basic Books, 1977). 
 Walzer, Michael. Arguing about War, (Yale University Press, 2004).

External links

 
 Just War Theory  Oregon State University
 Text of Cicero's Just War Theory in De Officiis
 Catholic Teaching Concerning Just War at Catholicism.org
 A Catholic Petition based on the Just War Doctrine
 Jeff McMahon, Rethinking the 'Just War,' Part 1, New York Times
 American Solidarity Party – New 3rd Party which applies Just War Theory in foreign policy
 "Just War" In Our Time, BBC Radio 4 discussion with John Keane and Niall Ferguson (3 June 1999)

Military ethics
Catholic social teaching
Catholic theology and doctrine
 
Thomas Aquinas
Christianity and violence